Australia Versus is an Australian show hosted by Tim Ross that initially aired on 6 July 2010. The format mixes archival footage of the listed events with comments from various Australian and international comedians, in a similar style to television series 20 to 1. The show is produced by FremantleMedia Australia.

Format
Australian comedians take on comedians from other countries such as England, Ireland or the US to debate a number of subjects. The battle sees comedians patriotically argue and sledge their way through a series of subject rounds, while contemporary and historical archive clips back up their arguments. An impartial panel of international judges from 17 countries determines a winner of each round and the overall winning country at the end of the show.

Comedians representing Australia include Anh Do, Julia Morris, Fiona O'Loughlin, Peter Helliar, Peter Berner, Jo Stanley, Rebel Wilson, Corinne Grant, Heath Franklin, Dave Thornton, Greig Pickhaver, Joel Creasey and Jim Jefferies. 
The first episode features Australia vs England in the category of Film on topics such as Hottest Rising Star, Top Frock, Funniest Flick, Scariest Villain, Best Bond and Toughest Tough Guy.
The second episode features Australia vs England in the category of Music.

Episodes

Summary

 Winning Country
 Losing Country

Episode results

Episode 1

Episode 2

Episode 3

Episode 4

References

Seven Network original programming
2010 Australian television series debuts
2010 Australian television series endings
Australian satirical television shows